The Battle of Guadeloupe or the Action of 21–22 December 1779 was a naval engagement that took place off the French island of Guadeloupe in the Caribbean during the American Revolutionary War between three Royal Navy ships and three French Navy frigates. The Royal Navy under Joshua Rowley sighted and promptly chased the French frigates, all of which were captured after a brief fight.

Battle 
The French ships had been part of the Comte d Estaing's fleet.

The engagement that followed was one sided - the French ships were in disorder; their crews were weak; and they could not escape the vastly superior British  force. The Blanche was defeated and captured on the evening of 21 December. The Fortunée attempted to escape by throwing her quarter-deck guns overboard, but was captured on the early morning of 22 December, an hour before the Elise had struck.

The Blanche and Fortunée were thus added to the British navy.

Rowley then led his squadron to capture a large French convoy, which had sailed from Marseille, off Martinique.

References

Sources 

Conflicts in 1779
Guadeloupe (1779)
Guadeloupe (1779)
Guadeloupe (1779)
History of Guadeloupe
1779 in France
18th century in Guadeloupe